Grice-Hutchinson is an English surname.

People with the surname 

 George Grice-Hutchinson (1848-1906), English politician
 Marjorie Grice-Hutchinson (1908-2003), English economist

See also
 Hutchinson (surname)

English-language surnames
Compound surnames
Surnames of British Isles origin